Conques-en-Rouergue (literally Conques in Rouergue) is a commune in the department of Aveyron, southern France. It lies on the Lot river.  The municipality was established on 1 January 2016 by merger of the former communes of Conques, Grand-Vabre, Noailhac and Saint-Cyprien-sur-Dourdou.

Further reading

References

See also 
Communes of the Aveyron department

Communes of Aveyron
Populated places established in 2016